A municipality in Armenia referred to as community ( hamaynk, plural:  hamaynkner), is an administrative subdivision consisting of a settlement ( bnakavayr) or a group of settlements ( bnakavayrer) that enjoys local self-government. The settlements are classified as either towns ( kaghakner, singular  kaghak) or villages ( gyugher, singular ( gyugh). The administrative centre of a community could either be an urban settlement (town) or a rural settlement (village).

Two-thirds of the population are now urbanized. As of 2017, 63.6% of Armenians live in urban areas as compared to 36.4% in rural. As of the end of 2017, Armenia has 503 municipal communities (including Yerevan) of which 46 are urban and 457 are rural. The capital, Yerevan, also has the status of a community.

Each municipality bears the same name as its administrative centre, with the exception of 7 municipalities, of which 4 are located in Shirak Province (Ani Municipality with its centre Maralik, Arpi Municipality with its centre Berdasehen, Marmashen Municipality with its centre Mayisyan, Sarapat Municipality with its centre Torosgyugh), 1 is located in Gegharkunik Province (Geghamasar Municipality with its centre Sotk), 1 is located in Syunik Province (Tatev Municipality with its centre Shinuhayr), and 1 is located in Vayots Dzor Province (Yeghegis Municipality with its centre Shatin).

Here is a list of the municipalities of Armenia as of January 2018, classified by province and type:

Aragatsotn Province
Aragatsotn Province is currently divided into 72 municipal communities, of which 3 are urban and 69 are rural:

Rural communities and included settlements:

 Agarak
 Agarakavan
 Aghdzk
 Akunk
 Alagyaz
 Avshen
 Charchakis
 Jamshlu
 Kaniashir
 Mijnatun
 Mirak
 Rya Taza
 Shenkani
 Sipan
 Antarut
 Aragatsavan
 Arteni
 Getap
 Lusakn
 Aragatsotn
 Artashavan
 Aruch
 Ashnak
 Avan
 Khnusik
 Arevut
 Bazmaghbyur
 Byurakan
 Dashtadem
 Davtashen
 Ddmasar
 Dian
 Dprevank
 Garnahovit
 Ghazaravan
 Hako
 Hatsashen
 Irind
 Kakavadzor
 Kanch
 Karbi
 Karmrashen
 Katnaghbyur
 Kosh
 Lernarot
 Mastara
 Dzoragyugh
 Melikgyugh
 Metsadzor
 Nerkin Bazmaberd
 Nerkin Sasnashen
 Nor Amanos
 Nor Artik
 Nor Yedesia
 Ohanavan
 Orgov
 Oshakan
 Otevan
 Parpi
 Partizak
 Saghmosavan
 Sasunik
 Karin
 Shamiram
 Shgharshik
 Sorik
 Suser
 Tatul
 Tegher
 Tlik
 Tsaghkahovit
 Berkarat
 Geghadir
 Geghadzor
 Gegharot
 Hnaberd
 Lernapar
 Norashen
 Sadunts
 Tsilkar
 Vardablur
 Tsaghkasar
 Tsamakasar
 Ujan
 Ushi
 Verin Bazmaberd
 Verin Sasunik
 Verin Sasnashen
 Voskehat
 Vosketas
 Voskevaz
 Yeghnik
 Zarinja
 Zovasar

Ararat Province
Ararat Province is currently divided into 95 municipal communities, of which 4 are urban and 91 are rural:

Rural communities and included settlements:

 Abovyan
 Araksavan
 Aralez
 Ararat
 Arbat
 Arevabuyr
 Argavand
 Arevshat
 Armash
 Avshar
 Aygepat
 Aygestan
 Aygavan
 Aygezard
 Ayntap
 Azatashen
 Azatavan
 Baghramyan
 Bardzrashen
 Berdik
 Berkanush
 Burastan
 Byuravan
 Dalar
 Darakert
 Darbnik
 Dashtakar
 Dashtavan
 Deghdzut
 Dimitrov
 Ditak
 Dvin
 Geghanist
 Getapnya
 Getazat
 Ghukasavan
 Ginevet
 Goravan
 Hayanist
 Hnaberd
 Hovtashat
 Hovtashen
 Jrahovit
 Jrashen
 Kaghtsrashen
 Kanachut
 Khachpar
 Lanjar
 Lanjazat
 Lusarat
 Lusashogh
 Marmarashen
 Masis
 Mkhchyan
 Mrganush
 Mrgavan
 Mrgavet
 Narek
 Nizami
 Nor Kharberd
 Nor Kyank
 Nor Kyurin
 Nor Ughi
 Norabats
 Noramarg
 Norashen
 Noyakert
 Nshavan
 Paruyr Sevak
 Tigranashen
 Pokr Vedi
 Ranchpar
 Sayat-Nova
 Shahumyan
 Sipanik
 Sis
 Sisavan
 Surenavan
 Taperakan
 Urtsadzor
 Lanjanist
 Shaghap
 Urtsalanj
 Vanashen
 Vardashat
 Vardashen
 Verin Artashat
 Verin Dvin
 Vosketap
 Vostan
 Yeghegnavan
 Yeraskh
 Zangakatun
 Zorak

Armavir Province
Armavir Province is currently divided into 97 municipal communities, of which 3 are urban and 94 are rural:

Rural communities and included settlements:

Aghavnatun
Aknalich
Aknashen
Alashkert
Amasia
Amberd
Apaga
Aragats
Araks (Armavir)
Araks (Vagharshapat)
Aratashen
Arazap
Arevadasht
Arevashat
Arevik
Argavand
Argina
Armavir
Arshaluys
Artamet
Artashar
Artimet
Aygek
Aygeshat (Armavir)
Aygeshat (Vagharshapat)
Aygevan
Bagaran
Baghramyan (Armavir)
Baghramyan (Vagharshapat)
Bambakashat
Berkashat
Dalarik
Dasht
Doghs
Ferik
Gai
Geghakert
Getashen
Griboyedov
Hatsik
Haykashen
Haykavan
Haytagh
Hovtamej
Hushakert
Janfida
Jrarat
Jrarbi
Jrashen
Karakert
Khanjyan
Khoronk
Koghbavan
Lenughi
Lernagog
Lernamerdz
Lukashin
Lusagyugh
Margara
Mayisyan
Merdzavan
Metsamor
Mrgastan
Mrgashat
Musaler
Myasnikyan
Nalbandyan
Norakert
Nor Armavir
Nor Artagers
Nor Kesaria
Norapat
Noravan
Parakar
Tairov
Pshatavan
Ptghunk
Sardarapat
Shahumyan
Shahumyani trchnafabrika
Shenavan
Shenik
Talvorik
Tandzut
Taronik
Tsaghkalanj
Tsaghkunk
Tsiatsan
Vanand
Vardanashen
Voskehat
Yeghegnut
Yeraskhahun
Yervandashat
Zartonk

Gegharkunik Province
Gegharkunik Province is currently divided into 57 municipal communities (hamaynkner), of which 5 are urban and 52 are rural.

Rural communities and included settlements:

 Akhpradzor
 Akunk
 Artsvanist
 Astghadzor
 Berdkunk
 Chkalovka
 Ddmashen
 Dzoragyugh
 Gandzak
 Geghakar
 Geghamasar Municipality, centre: Sotk 
 Areguni
 Arpunk
 Avazan
 Azat
 Daranak
 Geghamabak
 Geghamasar
 Jaghatsadzor
 Kakhakn
 Kut
 Kutakan
 Norabak
 Pambak
 Pokr Masrik
 Shatjrek
 Shatvan
 Tretuk
 Geghamavan
 Gegharkunik
 Geghhovit
 Lernahovit
 Hayravank
 Karchaghbyur
 Karmirgyugh
 Khachaghbyur
 Lanjaghbyur
 Lchap
 Lchashen
 Lchavan
 Lichk
 Lusakunk
 Madina
 Makenis
 Mets Masrik
 Nerkin Getashen
 Norakert
 Norashen
 Noratus
 Sarukhan
 Semyonovka
 Shoghakat
 Aghberk
 Artanish
 Drakhtik
 Jil
 Tsapatagh
 Torfavan
 Tsaghkashen
 Tsaghkunk
 Tsakkar
 Tsovagyugh
 Tsovasar
 Tsovazard
 Tsovak
 Tsovinar
 Vaghashen
 Vanevan
 Vardadzor
 Vardenik
 Varser
 Verin Getashen
 Yeranos
 Zolakar
 Zovaber

Kotayk Province
Kotayk Province is currently divided into 42 municipal communities, of which 7 are urban and 35 are rural:

Lori Province
Lori Province is currently divided into 57 municipal communities, of which 7 are urban and 50 are rural:

Shirak Province
Shirak Province is currently divided into 42 municipal communities, of which 3 are urban and 39 are rural:

Syunik Province
Syunik Province is currently divided into 8 municipal communities, of which 5 are urban, and 3 are rural:

Tavush Province
Tavush Province is currently divided into 24 municipal communities, of which 5 are urban, and 19 are rural:

Vayots Dzor Province
Vayots Dzor Province is currently divided into 8 municipal communities (hamaynkner), of which 3 are urban, and 5 are rural:

Yerevan
The capital Yerevan holds the status of a single municipal community divided into 12 administrative districts:

Sources: Armenia 2011 census

References

External links
 Khachatryan, Anush; Karapetyan, Arsen: "Public Green Space in Armenian Cities: A Legal Analysis" in the Caucasus Analytical Ddigest No. 23

 
Armenia
Municipalities
Armenia, Municipalities
Armenia 2
Armenia 2
Municipalities